Thracology is the scientific study of Ancient Thrace and Thracian antiquities and is a regional and thematic branch of the larger disciplines of ancient history and archaeology. A practitioner of the discipline is a Thracologist. Thracology investigates the range of ancient Thracian culture (language, literature, history, religion, art, economics and ethics) from 1000 BC up to the end of Roman rule in the 4th–7th centuries AD. Modern Thracology (as opposed to an antiquarian interest in the land of Thrace) started with the work of Wilhelm Tomaschek in the late 19th century.

Thracology in Bulgaria 
In the second part of the 20th century, Bulgarian historian Alexander Fol founded the Institute of Thracology in the Bulgarian Academy of Science. With subsequently ever-increasing Thracian tombs unearthing, the study of the Ancient Thracian civilization was able to proceed with greater academic rigor.

Thracology in Romania 
Since Dacians are considered a branch of the Thracians by most mainstream research and historical sources, Romanian historians and archaeologists have also been heavily involved in Thracology since at least the 19th century. The related term Thraco-Dacology also exists, alluding to Thraco-Dacian, and one of the first uses is from around 1980, in the Romanian government archive.

But since other theories sustain that Daco-Thracian relation is not as strong as originally thought, Dacology may evolve as an independent discipline from Thracology.
Unfortunately, the terms Dacology/Dacologist have been negatively affected by the association with protochronism and risk to be severely compromised, prompting some reputable Romanian researchers to call themselves Thracologists instead of Dacologists, even in the context of their research being focused more on Dacians than on Thracians, and even without necessarily promoting a strong connection between the two peoples.

The Romanian Thracology Institute I.G Bibicescu, part of Romanian Academy and based in Bucharest, was founded in 1976, after the 2nd International Congress of Thracology held in September of same year in Bucharest. One of his first directors was the thracologist Dumitru Berciu (1907–1998).

Thracologists
Researchers who have been noted in the field of Thracology include:
Gavril Katsarov – Bulgarian historian, classical philologist and archeologist
Vladimir I. Georgiev – Bulgarian linguist
Georgi Kitov – Bulgarian archaeologist
Alexander Fol – Bulgarian Thracologist
Ion Niculiţă – Moldavian archaeologist
Sorin Olteanu – Romanian Thracologist, focused on Thraco-Daco-Moesian languages
 Engin Beksac – Turkish archaeologist and art historian
 Bogdan Petriceicu Hasdeu – Romanian Daco-Thracologist and historian
 Ion I. Russu- Romanian Daco-Thracologist and historian
 Dumitru Berciu – Director of the Romanian Thracology Institute
 Margarita Tacheva – Bulgarian Thracologist

International Congress of Thracology
The International Congress of Thracology was organised by the Institute of Thracology at the Bulgarian Academy of Sciences. It has been held regularly since 1972 when it was founded by Alexander Fol. Fol himself became the chairman of the congress, and emphasized an international approach to the study of Thracology.

Thracians and Myceneans
On September 21–26, 1984, the Fourth International Congress of Thracology was held in the Museum Boymans-van Beuningen in Rotterdam, Netherlands. The Congress was organized by the Henri Frankfort Foundation, which is a private institution whose main purpose is to augment the study of Mediterranean pre-history and proto-history. The opening of the symposium began on September 24 and was addressed by the Minister of Education and Science Dr. W. J. Deetman. "Thracians and Mycenaeans" was the theme name for the symposium, which held discussions pertaining to the potential ethnic, cultural, religious, and linguistic interrelations between proto-Thracians and proto-Greeks (i.e. Myceneans). It was believed that such interrelations had to exist since both groups have lived in the same geographic area in the past. According to Alexander Fol, the concept of "Mycenean Thrace" was first developed in 1973 in order to explain the relative cultural unity between the Thracians and the Myceneans.

See also
Bulgarian Academy of Sciences
Thracians
Thracian language
Thracian mythology
Thracian kings
Thracian tribes
Dacia
Dacology

References

Bibliography

External links

Institute of Thracology – Bulgarian Academy of Science  – Institute of Thracology Official Site
Thracology.dir.bg – Sonya Ilieva's Web Page About Ancient Thrace and Thracology
Thracology.org – A site dedicated to the enigmatic ancient Thracian civilization
Thracology Scientific Lab of State University of Moldova
 http://www.imadrugpat.org/krovatova.pdf

 
Area studies by ancient history
Archaeology of Bulgaria
Archaeology of Romania